Phryneta hecphora is a species of beetle in the family Cerambycidae. It was described by James Thomson in 1857. It is known from Mozambique and Democratic Republic of the Congo.

References

Phrynetini
Beetles described in 1857